County Hall  is a municipal facility in Roscommon, County Roscommon, Ireland.

History
Originally Roscommon County Council held its meetings in Roscommon Courthouse. The county council moved a new facility, which was designed by ABK Architects, in December 2015. It was officially opened by Denis Naughten, Minister for Communications, Climate Action and Environment, in June 2016. The new facility received awards for Architectural Project of the Year and Sustainable Project of the Year at the CMG Irish Building & Design Awards 2016.

References

Buildings and structures in County Roscommon
Roscommon